Fotor is an online photo editing platform.

Fotor's software is available on mobile devices, desktop computers, and online as a web app. Fotor One-Tap Enhance is a tool designed to improve common imaging problems. Fotor GoArt is a tool to turn photos into classical painting style artwork. Fotor SDK is a solution to users' graphics-related needs

History 
Founded in 2012, Fotor Photo Editor can be used online or downloaded as a free mobile and computer application compatible with Windows, macOS, Android, and iOS. It is used to adjust and alter images, both photographic and non-photographic. As of 2014, the apps were supported in fourteen languages.

In addition to basic photo editing tools such as cropping, red eye removal, the use of stickers and overlays, photo unblurring, and aperture addition, Fotor can also be used for graphic design and collage making. Though the initial app is free, some options are only available through an in-app purchase, or via the Fotor Pro version. Fotor also has a module dedicated to making collages and smart templates with support for image layers.

In 2016, Fotor updated its HDR curves adjustment to its platform.

In late 2017, Fotor added a custom aspect ratio option to its collage function and altered its tilt-shift algorithm.

In 2018, Fotor Launched PxBee that entered the stock photo industry.

References

Software companies established in 2012
Editing software